WDW may refer to:

Walt Disney World, amusement park complex
WDW (Washington, D.C.), radio station from 1921–1922
Why Don't We, American pop boy band
WDW (TV station), a digital television station in Western Australia